Michael Keith Hibler (born January 29, 1946) is a former American football linebacker who played one season with the Cincinnati Bengals of the American Football League (AFL). He was drafted by the Oakland Raiders in the fifth round of the 1967 NFL Draft. He played college football at Stanford University and attended Saint Francis High School in Mountain View, California.

References

External links
Just Sports Stats

Living people
1946 births
American Football League players
American football linebackers
Cincinnati Bengals players
Players of American football from California
Sportspeople from Alameda County, California
Stanford Cardinal football players